Jamishan may refer to:
 Jamishan-e Olya (disambiguation)
 Jamishan-e Sofla